The Roman ship Isis was a very large ship that operated on the Mediterranean during the Roman Empire around 150 AD, carrying grain from Egypt to Italy. It has a carrying capacity of 1200 short tons or 1,071 long tonnes.

In his book Πλοἶον ἢ Εὐχαί ("The Ship, or The Wishes") the sophist Lucian described the Isis when he saw it in Athens' seaport Piraeus:

 I say, though, what a size that ship was! 180 feet long, the man said, and something over a quarter of that in width; and from deck to keel, the maximum depth, through the hold, 44 feet. And then the height of the mast, with its huge yard; and what a forestay it takes to hold it! And the lofty stern with its gradual curve, and its gilded beak, balanced at the other end by the long rising sweep of the prow, and the figures of her name-goddess, Isis, on either side. As to the other ornamental details, the paintings and the scarlet topsail, I was more struck by the anchors, and the capstans and windlasses, and the stern cabins. The crew was like a small army. And they were saying she carried as much corn as would feed every soul in Attica for a year. And all depends for its safety on one little old atomy of a man, who controls that great rudder with a mere broomstick of a tiller!

See also 
Syracusia
Jong (ship)
Timeline of largest passenger ships
List of world's largest wooden ships

References

Ancient Roman ships
150s in the Roman Empire